Hacking back is a technique by law enforcement agencies, to combat cybercrime by hacking the computing devices of the suspect. 

The effectiveness and ethics of hacking back is disputed.

Further reading

References 

Law enforcement